The Nebraskan is a 1953 3-D American Western film directed by Fred F. Sears starring Phil Carey and Roberta Haynes.  The Nebraskan was one of seven feature films from prolific director Fred Sears that were released that year.

Plot

Set in 1867 in the newly formed state of Nebraska, cavalry scout Wade Harper (Phil Carey) attempts to make peace with the Sioux Indians, who demand the handover of Wingfoot (Maurice Jara), an Indian scout who is believed to be responsible for the murder of their chief Thundercloud.  While being held in the guardhouse at Fort Kearny, Wingfoot escapes with Reno (Lee Van Cleef), an army private awaiting trial for murder.

Cast

Philip Carey as     Wade Harper
Roberta Haynes as   Paris
Wallace Ford as McBride
Richard Webb as Ace Eliot
Lee Van Cleef as Reno
Maurice Jara as Wingfoot
Regis Toomey as Col. Markham
Jay Silverheels as Spotted Bear
Pat Hogan as Yellow Knife
Dennis Weaver as Capt. DeWitt
Boyd "Red" Morgan as Sgt. Phillips

References

External links
 
 
 
 Dvdtalk - The Nebraskan 1953 

1953 films
1953 Western (genre) films
American 3D films
1953 3D films
American Western (genre) films
Films set in 1867
Films set in Nebraska
Columbia Pictures films
Films directed by Fred F. Sears
1950s English-language films
1950s American films